Self-Inflicted is the 8th album by Leaether Strip.

Track listing
 Hate Me!
 Black Candle
 Understand My Torment
 Are we the Sinners?
 Give It Back
 Face the Fire
 Coming up for Air
 Tell Me What to Do!
 Under My Control
 Kill a Raver
 Showroom Dummies (written by Kraftwerk)
 X-Files Theme (Written by Mark Snow)

Leæther Strip albums